Hans Roth (6 August 1903 – 7 November 1964) was a Swiss wrestler. He competed in the freestyle heavyweight event at the 1924 Summer Olympics.

References

External links

1903 births
1964 deaths
Olympic wrestlers of Switzerland
Wrestlers at the 1924 Summer Olympics
Swiss male sport wrestlers
Place of birth missing